Lucy Woodward Is...Hot & Bothered is the second studio album from American pop singer, Lucy Woodward. The album was first released on iTunes in 2007. It later had a physical release after being picked up as a Barnes & Noble exclusive in 2008, followed by a re-release on iTunes with additional tracks.

Track listing
"Love Is Gonna Getcha" 3:25
"Use What I Got" 4:07
"Submarine Love" 4:15
"You Found Me Out" 4:18
"Hot and Bothered" 4:13
"What I Can Do" 4:04
"Geographical Cure" 4:10
"Sugar" 3:59
"Don't Wanna Love Again" 3:49
"I Won't Care" 5:07

Singles
"Slow Recovery" (2007)

References

2007 albums
2008 albums
Lucy Woodward albums